Sara Gran (born 1971) is an American author.

Career
Gran is the author of seven novels, including Come Closer and Dope. Her novel Claire DeWitt and the City of the Dead was the first in a series; it won the 2012 Macavity Award for "Best Novel." Her third Claire DeWitt novel, The Infinite Blacktop, was published on September 18, 2018.

Gran started the small press Dreamland Books.

Television and film
A number of Gran's novels have come to the attention of the film and television industry. Her 2003 novel Come Closer was looked at by director Carter Smith although, nothing has yet been released. The same applies to her 2006 novel Dope, which had actress Julianne Moore slated for the lead role, although no episodes have yet been released.

Gran has written scripts for the TNT show Southland and two other series, Chance and Berlin Station. She also is developing an adaptation of Corinne May Botz's novel Nutshell Studies of Unexplained Death with director/producer Guillermo del Toro.

Bibliography

References

External links
 Updated 2016-02-28

1971 births
Living people
21st-century American novelists
American crime fiction writers
American mystery novelists
American women novelists
Writers from New York City
Women mystery writers
21st-century American women writers
Novelists from New York (state)